The Our Lady of the Rosary of Chiquinquirá Cathedral Also Santa Rosa de Osos Cathedral Is a cathedral church of Catholic worship dedicated to the Virgin Mary under the invocation of Our Lady of the Rosary of Chiquinquirá. It is located in the central zone of the city of Santa Rosa de Osos in the South American country of Colombia, to the south side of the Bolivar Park (Main Park).

The cathedral is the main church building of the Diocese of Santa Rosa de Osos, the seat of the Catholic Bishop. Likewise, it is the seat of the "Parish of the Cathedral". In 1917, Pope Benedict XV raised it to that rank when the Diocese was created.

See also
List of cathedrals in Colombia
Our Lady of the Rosary of Chiquinquirá
Roman Catholicism in Colombia

References

Roman Catholic cathedrals in Colombia
Roman Catholic churches completed in 1876
19th-century Roman Catholic church buildings in Colombia